Drakensberg Boys Choir School is a choir school located near Winterton, KwaZulu-Natal, South Africa, at the foot of the Central Drakensberg mountain range. Performing in a variety of genres such as jazz, pop and African music, the choir is based in South Africa but also tours internationally.

Organisation
The school was established in 1967 by John Tungay with assistance from his family. Typically, enrollment is about 120 boys, all  aged 9 to 15. The school admitted its first black student in 1988, six years before the end of Apartheid. It has an extensive campus, including a 600-seat auditorium constructed in 1995, and holds weekly concerts for the local population. The Choir has toured internationally.

Concert tours 

The choir has presented concerts in the United States and across Europe and, by Papal request, at the Vatican City. They have also performed with South Korean artist Lee Moon-se. Every year, boys from the choir embark on an international tour. Recent locations for tours have included the United Kingdom, the United States, and Japan. While on tour, they often collaborate with other local youth choirs.

Notable alumni
The Bala Brothers, the South African vocal trio, attended Drakensberg Boys Choir School in the 1980s and 90s.  In 1988, six years before the end of Apartheid, the oldest brother, Zwai, was the first black student admitted to the school.

Jean-Philip Grobler, an indie electronic synthpop artist, sang in the Drakensberg Boys' Choir before moving to Brooklyn, NY to make music as St. Lucia.

Ralph Schmidt went on to become the director of the Mzansi Youth Choir, which appeared in America's Got Talent.

Notes

References 
 Concert Review - Drakensberg Boys Choir - U.S. 3/2007, reviews by Lynn Schoch and Gene Hickman, ChoirBase 
 J. B. Lan (Jiří Bulan): Slavík z Dračích hor, 2008 May 6, in Czech about the first Czech member of the school, in English about the school
 Drakensberg Boys Choir School, Discover Our Drakensberg – Your Guide to the Drakensberg Mountains and Natal Midlands.

External links 
 

Boys' schools in South Africa
Boarding schools in South Africa
Nondenominational Christian schools in South Africa
Choir schools
Educational institutions established in 1967
1967 establishments in South Africa
Private schools in KwaZulu-Natal
Drakensberg